In anatomy, the radial veins are paired veins that accompany the radial artery through the back of the hand and the lateral aspect of the forearm.  They join the ulnar veins to form the brachial veins.

They follow the same course as the radial artery.

External links
 

Veins of the upper limb